Yaka is a belde (town) in Isparta Province, Turkey

Geography 
Yaka is in Gelendost district of Isparta Province. The population of the town was 1848 as of 2014.

History

The area around Yaka was probably populated during the Neolithic Age and there is a rock carved figure of a female to the east of the town which is thought to be of Cybele, the mother goddess of ancient Anatolia.  The present town was founded by Turks around the 15th century. The name of the town suggests that these people may be of Yaka tribe from Mangyshlak Peninsula at the east coast of Caspian Sea, now in Kazakhstan. (There are many other settlements in Turkey with the same name)  But the population of the settlement also included Greeks up to 20th century before population exchange agreement between Greece and Turkey. In 1975 the settlement was declared a seat of township.

Economy

Cattle rising and apple production constitute the main revenues of the town. There are also some small scale workshops. Another source of revenue is the former town residents who now are working in Germany as gastarbeiter.

References 

Populated places in Isparta Province
Gelendost District
Towns in Turkey